Cocoon is a 1985 American science fiction comedy-drama film directed by Ron Howard and written by Tom Benedek from a story by David Saperstein. The film stars Don Ameche, Wilford Brimley, Hume Cronyn, Brian Dennehy, Jack Gilford, Steve Guttenberg, Maureen Stapleton, Jessica Tandy, Gwen Verdon, Herta Ware, Tahnee Welch, and Linda Harrison, and follows a group of elderly people rejuvenated by aliens.

The film was shot in and around St. Petersburg, Florida, with locations including the St. Petersburg Shuffleboard Club, Suncoast Manor Retirement Community, the Coliseum, and Snell Arcade buildings. The film earned Academy Awards for Best Supporting Actor (Don Ameche) and Best Visual Effects, and was followed by the sequel Cocoon: The Return in 1988, in which almost all of the original cast reprised their roles.

Plot
About 10,000 years ago, peaceful aliens from the planet Antarea set up an outpost on Earth on Atlantis. When Atlantis sank, twenty aliens were left behind, kept alive in large rock-like cocoons at the bottom of the ocean. A group of Antareans have returned to collect them. Disguising themselves as humans, they rent a house with a swimming pool and charge the water with "life force" to give the cocooned Antareans energy to survive the trip home. They charter a boat from a local captain named Jack, who helps them retrieve the cocoons. Jack spies on Kitty, a beautiful woman from the team who chartered his boat, while she undresses in her cabin, and discovers that she is an alien. After the aliens reveal themselves to him and explain what is going on, he decides to help them.

Next door to the house the Antareans are renting is a retirement home. Three of its residents, Ben, Arthur, and Joe, often trespass to swim in the pool. They absorb some of the life force, making them feel younger and stronger. Eventually caught in the act, they are given permission to use the pool by the Antarean leader, Walter, on the condition that they do not touch the cocoons or tell anybody else about it. Rejuvenated with youthful energy, the three men let the advantages of the pool take hold as they are relieved of their ailments.

Kitty and Jack grow closer and decide to make love in the pool. Since she cannot do so in the human manner, she introduces him to the Antarean equivalent, in which she shares her life force energy with him.

The other retirement home residents become suspicious after witnessing Ben's wife Mary climb a tree. Their friend Bernie reveals the secret of the pool to the other residents, who rush to the pool to swim in its waters. When Walter finds them damaging one of the cocoons, he ejects them from the property. The Antereans open the damaged cocoon, and the creature inside shares his last moments with Walter. That evening, Bernie finds his wife Rose has stopped breathing and carries her body to the pool to heal her, only to be informed by Walter that the pool no longer works due to the other residents draining the life force in the rush to make themselves young.

Walter explains that the cocoons cannot survive the trip back to Antarea, but will be able to survive on Earth. With the help of Jack, Ben, Arthur and Joe, the Antareans return the cocoons to the sea. The Antareans offer to take residents of the retirement home with them to Antarea, where they will never grow older and never die. Most of them accept the offer, but Bernie chooses to remain on Earth.

Upon leaving, Ben tells his grandson David that he and Mary are leaving for good. As the residents are leaving, David's mother Susan finds out about their destination and drives to the retirement home, where they find the majority of the rooms vacant and contact local authorities.

While the police are searching for the residents, David notices Jack's boat, with the Antareans and the retirement residents aboard, starting and jumps onto the side as it pulls away. The boat is chased by the Coast Guard, so with little time left, David says goodbye to Ben and Mary before jumping into the water. The Coast Guard boats stop to pick him up, giving the others a chance to get away. A thick fog appears and strands the remaining Coast Guard boats, and they call off the chase.

As the Antarean ship appears, Walter pays Jack for his services and the boat. Jack embraces Kitty for the last time and they share a kiss. He then says farewell to everyone before jumping into an inflatable raft as the boat rises up into the Antarean vessel. Jack watches as the boat disappears inside the ship and departs.

Back on earth, a funeral is held for the missing residents. During the sermon, David looks toward the sky and smiles.

Cast

 Don Ameche as Art Selwyn
 Wilford Brimley as Ben Luckett
 Hume Cronyn as Joe Finley
 Brian Dennehy as Walter
 Jack Gilford as Bernie Lefkowitz
 Steve Guttenberg as Jack Bonner
 Maureen Stapleton as Mary Luckett
 Jessica Tandy as Alma Finley
 Gwen Verdon as Bess McCarthy
 Herta Ware as Rose Lefkowitz
 Tahnee Welch as Kitty
 Barret Oliver as David
 Linda Harrison as Susan
 Tyrone Power Jr. as Pillsbury
 Clint Howard as John Dexter
 Charles Lampkin as Pops
 Paul Arlen Talbert as Coroner
 Mike Nomad as Doc
 Jorge Gil as Lou Pine
 Rance Howard as St. Petersburg detective
 James Ritz as DMV clerk
 Peter Cody as boy in nursing home lobby
 Jim Fitzpatrick as Dock Worker (uncredited)

Casting for the film and its sequel was overseen by casting director Beverly McDermott.

Production
Robert Zemeckis was originally hired as director, and spent a year working on it in development. He was at the time directing Romancing the Stone, another film for the same studio, 20th Century Fox. Fox executives previewed Romancing the Stone before its release in 1984 and hated it. That, in addition to his two previous directorial efforts, I Wanna Hold Your Hand and Used Cars, both being commercial failures (though critically acclaimed) led the studio to fire Zemeckis as director of Cocoon. He was replaced with Ron Howard. 

Location filming took place in St. Petersburg, Florida, between August 20 and November 1, 1984.

Wilford Brimley was only 49 when he was cast as a senior citizen, and turned 50 during filming; he was as much as 26 years younger than the actors playing the other elderly characters. In order to look the part, Brimley bleached his hair and moustache to turn them gray, and had wrinkles and liver spots drawn on his face.

Soundtrack

The score for Cocoon was composed and conducted by James Horner. The soundtrack was released twice, through Polydor Records in 1985 and a reprint through P.E.G. in 1997 and features eleven tracks of score and a vocal track performed by Michael Sembello. Despite the reprint, it is still considered a rarity among soundtrack collectors.

Reception
The film received mostly positive critical reception. Commented The New York Times Janet Maslin, "Mr. Howard brings a real sweetness to his subject, as does the film's fine cast of veteran stars; he has also given Cocoon the bright, expansive look of a hot-weather hit. And even when the film begins to falter, as it does in its latter sections, Mr. Howard's touch remains reasonably steady. He does the most he can with material that, after an immensely promising opening, heads into the predictable territory of Spielberg-inspired beatific science fiction." Variety called it "a fountain of youth fable which imaginatively melds galaxy fantasy with the lives of aging mortals in a Florida retirement home [and] weaves a mesmerizing tale."

The film holds a 76% "Fresh" rating on Rotten Tomatoes from 33 critics. The critical consensus reads, "Though it may be too sentimental for some, Ron Howard's supernatural tale of eternal youth is gentle and heartwarming, touching on poignant issues of age in the process." Metacritic gave the film a score of 65 based on 18 reviews, indicating "generally favorable reviews".

The film was also a box office hit, making over $76 million in North America where it became the sixth highest-grossing film of 1985.

AccoladesAcademy Awards Best Actor in a Supporting Role, Don Ameche in 1985
 Best Visual Effects in 1985 (David Berry, Scott Farrar, Ralph McQuarrie and Ken Ralston).Saturn Awards Best Director, Ron Howard - Won
 Best Science Fiction Film - Nominated
 Best Actor, Hume Cronyn - Nominated
 Best Actress, Jessica Tandy - Nominated
 Best Supporting Actress, Gwen Verdon - Nominated
 Best Writing, Tom Benedek - Nominated
 Best Music, James Horner - NominatedOther honors'

The film is recognized by American Film Institute in these lists:
 2006: AFI's 100 Years...100 Cheers – Nominated
 2008: AFI's 10 Top 10:
 Nominated Science Fiction Film

References

External links

 
 
 
 

1980s fantasy comedy-drama films
1980s science fiction comedy-drama films
1985 films
20th Century Fox films
American fantasy comedy-drama films
American science fiction comedy-drama films
1980s English-language films
Films about ancient astronauts
Films scored by James Horner
Films about health care
Films about old age
Films directed by Ron Howard
Films featuring a Best Supporting Actor Academy Award-winning performance
Films produced by David Brown
Films produced by Richard D. Zanuck
Films set in Atlantis
Films set in Florida
Films shot in Florida
Films shot in the Bahamas
Films that won the Best Visual Effects Academy Award
Polydor Records soundtracks
The Zanuck Company films
1980s American films